The Erdman Act of 1898 was a United States federal law regulating railroad labor disputes.  The law provided arbitration for disputes between the interstate railroads and their workers organized into unions.

Major provisions
The most significant portion of the act prohibited a railroad company from demanding that a worker not join a union as a condition for employment (Section 10). 

The interstate requirement affected individuals who worked on moving trains, such as firemen, brakemen, telegraphers, and conductors, providing that the train transported freight and passengers between states. Workers who maintained railroad cars and station clerks did not come under the statute's jurisdiction. While the arbitration system created by the act was voluntary, the results were binding if all sides agreed to arbitrate.

Capital and labor each chose one of three arbitrators under the act; if they could not agree upon a third, the government would. The Chair of the Interstate Commerce Commission and the United States Commissioner of Labor, acting in concert, made that choice under those circumstances.

The act made it unlawful to strike or fire a worker during the arbitration process; it also made it illegal to terminate the employment of a worker involved in the dispute while arbitration was pending, except for neglecting duty or inefficiency. 

In Adair v. United States (1908), the United States Supreme Court declared Section 10 of the Erdman Act unconstitutional.

See also
History of rail transport in the United States

References

 Jay Finley Christ, "The Federal Courts and Organized Labor. II. From the Sherman Act to the Clayton Act (Continued)," The Journal of Business of the University of Chicago (1930), pp. 341-375.
 David A. McCabe, "Federal Intervention in Labor Disputes Under the Erdman, Newlands, and Adamson Acts," Proceedings of the Academy of Political Science in the City of New York, Vol. 7, No. 1, Labor Disputes and Public Service Corporations. (Jan., 1917), pp. 94-107.

United States federal labor legislation
United States railroad regulation
1898 in American law
United States federal legislation articles without infoboxes
1898 in labor relations